Below is a list of museums in the Maldives.

List
 National Museum (Maldives)

See also
 List of museums

Maldives
Museums
Maldives
Museums